Last of the Duanes is a 1941 American Western film based on the novel by Zane Grey directed by James Tinling and written by William Conselman Jr. and Irving Cummings Jr. The film stars George Montgomery, Lynne Roberts, Eve Arden, Francis Ford, George E. Stone and William Farnum. The film was released on September 26, 1941, by 20th Century Fox.

The film was based on a 1941 Zane Grey novel, Last of the Duanes. This was the final of four films based on the novel; a 1919 silent film adaptation starred William Farnum, a 1924 adaptation starred Tom Mix, and a 1930 adaptation starred George O'Brien.

Plot

Cast  
George Montgomery as Buck Duane
Lynne Roberts as Nancy Bowdrey
Eve Arden as Kate
Francis Ford as Luke Stevens
George E. Stone as Euchre
William Farnum as Texas Ranger Major McNeil
Joe Sawyer as Bull Lossomer 
Truman Bradley as Texas Ranger Capt. Laramie
Russell Simpson as Tom Duane
Don Costello as Jim Bland
Harry Woods as Sheriff Red Morgan
Andrew Tombes as Sheriff Frank Taylor

References

External links 
 

1941 films
20th Century Fox films
American Western (genre) films
1941 Western (genre) films
Films directed by James Tinling
Films based on works by Zane Grey
American black-and-white films
1940s English-language films
1940s American films